The Ramadan Cup (also known as the Sheikh Sharubutu Ramadan Cup) is an annual football competition played between May and June depending on the Ramadan calendar of the year within the Muslim Ramadan season.

History 
The Ramadan Cup was started in 2015, with six teams competing in the inaugural competition. Ashaiman emerged as the maiden champions after defeating Nima Zongo by 7–6 in a penalty shootout after the match ended goalless in normal regulation time.

The tournament which is an initiative under the auspices of the Ghana National Chief Imam, Sheikh Osman Nuhu Sharubutu serves as a way of promoting peace and unity within the Zongo (Muslim) communities in Ghana as its tagline reads ‘Bringing the Zongo Community Together’.

The tournament saw the introduction of the Video Assistant Referee (VAR) in the 2021 final.

Format 
In 2021, the tournament was played between 24-Zongo communities across Ghana.

Venues 
After the Fadama Astroturf also known as the Sheikh Sharubutu Sports Complex at New Fadama, Accra was completed, the field served as the venue for the 2021 tournament.

Winners & finalists

Sponsorship 
The Ramadan Cup was sponsored by Royal Bank from 2015 to 2017, with the bank serving as the tournament's headline sponsor. Since then, the tournament has attracted sponsors including Electroland Ghana Limited (Nasco Electronics), Ashfoam, Adonko Next Level Energy Drink and Holiday Inn Hotel, 5 Star Energy Drink and Afro Arab Group.

Over the years the tournament has been supported by government agencies including the Ministry of Zongo and Inner Cities Development and National Sports Authority.

References 

Football competitions in Ghana
Football cup competitions in Ghana